Thomas Mayson may refer to:

Tom Fletcher Mayson (1893–1958), English recipient of the Victoria Cross
Tom Mayson (Canadian football) (1928–2010), Canadian football player
Tommy Mayson (1886–1972), English footballer

See also
Thomas Mason (disambiguation)
Mayson (surname)